On March 7, 2022, after 2:40 pm, a shooting occurred within the vicinity of East High School in Des Moines, Iowa, U.S, right before school was being dismissed for the day. At least 35 gunshots were fired out of at least three vehicles.

One 15-year-old boy was killed, and two female students were critically wounded. By the next few hours, six teenage males were arrested, ranging from ages 14 to 17, and charged with one count of first-degree murder and two counts of attempted murder: four charged in adult court, and two in juvenile court.

The shooting was described by police as having gang overtones, having stemmed from an ongoing violent conflict between two rival Iowa Hispanic gangs.

Shooting
Around 2:40 p.m., neighborhood camera footage captured the shooting. Footage showed a group of five teenagers gathering near a curb when three vehicles passed by. The vehicles suddenly returned, with the occupants inside firing multiple shots at the group. Multiple 911 calls were then made at approximately 2:50 p.m.

Investigators recovered about 20 spent shell casings at the shooting site and found another 15 in the vehicles that the Des Moines Police Department said were used in the shooting.

Investigation
The Bureau of Alcohol, Tobacco, Firearms and Explosives (ATF) of Kansas City arrived on the scene and provided assistance in the investigation. Other agencies assisting with the investigation included: the Iowa State Patrol (ISP), the Polk County Sheriff's Office, the FBI, and the Des Moines Public Schools Department of Public Safety. Multiple search warrants were executed, and six guns were recovered. By March 30, several teenagers were arrested in connection with the shooting. In September one of the teens pled guilty to second-degree murder as part of a plea bargain. In November, Kevin Martinez, one of the car drivers, after pleading guilty to two charges of intimidation with a dangerous weapon was sentenced to a total of 20 years in prison. In February 2023, Romeo Perdomo was sentenced to life with parole after pleading guilty to first degree murder.

Victims
The victim killed was Jose David Lopez, a 15-year-old non-student of the school. He was a student of another Des Moines high school who was visiting the campus. Police say he was the intended target of the shooting, with the two female victims not intended targets, aged 16 and 18. The two female victims were both shot in the head and critically injured, and were students at the school. In a late March 2022 article by 12NewsNow, an 18-year-old victim (Kemery Ortega) hit in the head with a bullet was making a recovery, and was planning on leaving the hospital soon. She however still may have fragments or much of the bullet still lodged in her skull. The other girl wounded was also still critically injured as of late March but was on the mend.

Aftermath
U.S. President Joe Biden released a statement regarding the shooting and the greater violence issue in American society.

References

2022 in Iowa
Crimes in Iowa
Gangs in Iowa
History of Des Moines, Iowa
High school shootings in the United States
2022 murders in the United States
High school killings in the United States
Mass shootings in Iowa
March 2022 crimes in the United States